Revolution DNA is the fifth studio album by the Greek death metal band Septic Flesh. This album shows the band continuing their mixture of death metal with even stronger gothic rock elements than before, while also introducing elements of industrial. The album also puts a much larger emphasis on clean vocals than any other Septic Flesh album, along with death growls being largely replaced by a less intense, spoken-rasped style.

Track listing 
All lyrics written by Sotiris V.

Personnel 
 Spiros A. – bass, vocals, artwork & layout
 Sotiris V. – guitar, vocals
 Christos A. – guitar, samplers
 Akis K. – drums
 Fredrik Nordström – sound engineering, production
 The Mastering Room – mastering
 Chris Kissadjekian - photos
 Vangelis Rassias (Studio Rassias) - band photos

External links

Official Myspace
Revolution DNA at Metal Archives
Revolution DNA at Metal Storm

1999 albums
Septicflesh albums
Albums with cover art by Spiros Antoniou
Albums produced by Fredrik Nordström
Holy Records albums
Albums by Greek artists